Morbidelli may refer to:

People
 Alessandro Morbidelli (born 1966), Italian astronomer
 Alessandro Morbidelli (born 1989), Italian footballer
 Franco Morbidelli (born 1994), Italian motorcycle racer
 Gianni Morbidelli (born 1968), Italian racing driver
 Giorgio Morbidelli (born 1974), Italian bobsledder
 Pasqualino Morbidelli (born 1948), Italian boxer

Other uses
 Morbidelli, Italian motorcycle manufacturer

Italian-language surnames